The Three Musketeers (French: Les trois mousquetaires) is a 1932 French historical adventure film directed by Henri Diamant-Berger and starring Aimé Simon-Girard, Henri Rollan and Thomy Bourdelle.The film is an adaptation of Alexandre Dumas's 1844 novel The Three Musketeers, and was the first version to be as a  sound film.

It is a remake of Diamant-Berger's own silent film-series The Three Musketeers (1921), again with Aimé Simon-Girard and Henri Rollan as D'Artagnan and Athos.

Cast

References

Bibliography 
 K. L. Maund & Phil Nanson. The Four Musketeers: The True Story of D'Artagnan, Porthos, Aramis & Athos. Tempus, 2005.

External links 

1932 films
1930s historical adventure films
1930s action adventure films
French action adventure films
French historical adventure films
1930s French-language films
Films based on The Three Musketeers
Films directed by Henri Diamant-Berger
Films set in the 1620s
Films set in France
Films set in Paris
French black-and-white films
Remakes of French films
Sound film remakes of silent films
Cultural depictions of Cardinal Richelieu
Cultural depictions of Louis XIII
1930s French films